Shahr-e Gholghola or Gholghola City (also City of Screams, City of Woe, City of Sorrows) is an archaeological site located near the town of Bamyan, Afghanistan.

The Siege of Bamyan took place here in 1221 during the Mongol pursuit of Jalal ad-Din Mingburnu, the last ruler of the Khwarezmian Empire. Mutukan, son of Chagatai Khan and favourite grandson of Genghis Khan, was killed in battle by an arrow from the besieged walls, which led Genghis to massacre the population of the city and its surrounding region (the origin of the city's moniker "City of Woe").

See also
Bamyan, Afghanistan
Shahr-e Zuhak, Bamyan
Siege of Bamyan

References

Hazara people
Hazarajat
Bamyan Province